Kralevo may refer to:
 Kralevo, Haskovo Province, a village in the Stambolovo Municipality, Haskovo Province, Bulgaria
 , a village in the Targovishte Municipality, Targovishte Province, Bulgaria

See also
 Kraljevo (disambiguation)